Lee Sandales is an English set decorator. He is mostly known for his work on the films War Horse (2011), Star Wars: The Force Awakens (2015), Rogue One (2016) and 1917 (2019). Throughout his career, he has been nominated for two Academy Awards and won a BAFTA Award.

Early life
Sandales was born and grew up in Gateacre, Liverpool. He attended the local comprehensive school, before attending University of Roehampton and getting his first job.

Partial filmography

As set decorator
 Separate Lies (2005)
 Casino Royale (2006)
 Green Zone (2010)
 Sex and the City 2 (2010)
 Blitz (2011)
 War Horse (2011)
 Wrath of the Titans (2012)
 Maleficent (2014)
 Star Wars: The Force Awakens (2015)
 Rogue One (2016)
 Solo: A Star Wars Story (2018)
 1917 (2019)
 Dolittle (2020)

As art director
 Love, Honour and Obey (2000)

Awards and nominations

Major associations

Academy Awards

British Academy Film Awards

References

External links
 

Living people
Alumni of the University of Roehampton
Best Production Design BAFTA Award winners
English set decorators
Film people from Liverpool
People from Gateacre
Year of birth missing (living people)